Wisconsin Highway 10 (WIS 10) was a state trunk highway that traveled roughly along the following present-day routes:

 U.S. Highway 51: WIS 10 traveled along the entirety of US 51 in Wisconsin.
 U.S. Highway 2: WIS 10 traveled along most of the western portion of US 2 from Ironwood to Superior.

Reference

10